Earthquake  is the first album by Electric Sun. It was released in 1979 by Metronome.

Track listing
 All compositions by Uli Roth
 Electric Sun 5:16
 Lilac 2:49
 Burning Wheels Turning 6:41
 Japanese Dream 3:52
 Sundown 4:06
 Winterdays 1:25
 Still So Many Lives Away 4:40
 Earthquake 10:31

Personnel
Electric Sun
Uli Roth - guitars, vocals
Clive Edwards - drums
Ule Ritgen - bass guitar

References

1979 debut albums
Electric Sun albums